"Who's Holding Donna Now" is a 1985 hit single recorded by DeBarge for the Gordy label. It was their second consecutive Top 10 Pop hit in the U. S. after the release of "Rhythm of the Night".

After recording the successful dance single, the group returned to their more comfortable standard of ballads. Relying on an outside producer, outside songwriters, and background vocalists, Richard Page and Steve George, this song was recorded and released as the second single from their fourth album, Rhythm of the Night.

The song reached number six on the U.S. Billboard Hot 100 on the chart dated August 10, 1985 and spent four weeks at number two on the R&B chart on July 26, 1985.  It also became DeBarge's third song to top the Billboard Adult Contemporary listing on July 19, 1985.

The song appeared in a late 1985 episode of the daytime soap opera All My Children.

Charts

Personnel 
 El DeBarge – lead vocals 
 Steve George, Richard Page – backing vocals  
 David Foster – electric piano, synthesizers 
 Robbie Buchanan – synthesizers 
 Jay Graydon – synthesizers 
 Steve Porcaro – synthesizers 
 Abraham Laboriel – bass
 Carlos Vega – drums

See also
List of number-one adult contemporary singles of 1985 (U.S.)

References

1985 songs
DeBarge songs
Songs written by David Foster
Songs written by Jay Graydon
Songs written by Randy Goodrum
1985 singles
Gordy Records singles
1980s ballads
Contemporary R&B ballads